R502 road may refer to:
 R502 road (Ireland)
 R502 road (South Africa)